"Black Mountain Side" is an instrumental by the English rock band Led Zeppelin. It was recorded in October 1968 at Olympic Studios in London, and is included on the group's 1969 debut album Led Zeppelin.

Composition and recording
"Black Mountain Side" was inspired by a traditional Irish folk song called "Down by Blackwaterside". The guitar arrangement closely follows Bert Jansch's version of that song, recorded for his 1966 album Jack Orion. Al Stewart, who followed Jansch's gigs, taught it to Page, who was a session musician for Stewart's debut album.
Page played the instrumental on a borrowed Gibson J-200 acoustic guitar which was tuned to D–A–D–G–A–D, a tuning that he had used for "White Summer". To enhance the Indian character of the song, drummer and sitarist Viram Jasani played tabla on the track.

The overall Eastern-flavour of the structure led writer William S. Burroughs to make a suggestion to Page:

Performances
In concert, "Black Mountain Side" was often performed with "White Summer". A recording from Royal Albert Hall on 9 January 1970 is included on the Led Zeppelin DVD (2003).

See also
List of Led Zeppelin songs written or inspired by others

References

1960s instrumentals
Led Zeppelin songs
1969 songs
Songs written by Jimmy Page
Song recordings produced by Jimmy Page
British folk songs
Raga rock songs